The Wenallt Formation is a geologic formation near Garth in Powys, Wales. It preserves fossils dating back to the Ordovician period.

See also

 List of fossiliferous stratigraphic units in Wales

References

 

Geologic formations of Wales
Ordovician System of Europe
Ordovician Wales
Ordovician southern paleotemperate deposits